Grover Lee Broadfoot (December 27, 1892May 18, 1962) was an American lawyer and judge from Wisconsin.  He was a justice of the Wisconsin Supreme Court for thirteen years and was briefly Chief Justice for the last 5 months of his life. Earlier in his career, he had been the 30th Attorney General of Wisconsin, a member of the Wisconsin State Assembly, Mayor of Mondovi, Wisconsin, and District Attorney of Buffalo County for twelve years.

Biography

Born in Independence, Wisconsin, Broadfoot moved with his family to Mondovi, Wisconsin, where he graduated from high school. Broadfoot graduated from the University of Wisconsin, where he also received his law degree in 1918, and then enlisted in the army during World War I. Later he was the district attorney of Buffalo County, Wisconsin and was mayor of Mondovi, Wisconsin from 1943 to 1947. In 1947 he served in the Wisconsin State Assembly until June 5, 1948, when he resigned to become Attorney General of Wisconsin. He then resigned on November 12, 1948, when he was appointed to the Wisconsin Supreme Court. In 1962 he became chief justice, serving until his death. He died of a heart ailment in Minneapolis.

Notes

External links

People from Independence, Wisconsin
People from Mondovi, Wisconsin
Military personnel from Wisconsin
University of Wisconsin Law School alumni
Chief Justices of the Wisconsin Supreme Court
Wisconsin Attorneys General
Members of the Wisconsin State Assembly
Mayors of places in Wisconsin
1892 births
1962 deaths
20th-century American judges
20th-century American politicians
United States Army personnel of World War I